Gobernador Dupuy is a department of San Luis Province, Argentina.

With an area of  it is the biggest department in the province. It borders to the north with the departments of Juan Martín de Pueyrredón and General Pedernera, to the east with the provinces of Córdoba and La Pampa, to the south with La Pampa and to the west with Mendoza Province.

Municipalities 
 Anchorena
 Arizona
 Bagual
 Batavia
 Buena Esperanza
 Fortín El Patria
 Fortuna
 La Maroma
 Martín de Loyola
 Nahuel Mapá
 Navia
 Nueva Galia
 Unión

Villages 
 Aurora Puntana
 Bajada Nueva
 Casimiro Gómez
 Cochequingán
 Colonia Calzada
 Colonia La Florida
 Colonia La Verde
 Colonia Urdaniz
 Coronel Segovia
 El Peje
 El Porvenir
 Frisia
 Los Overos
 Nueva Constitución
 Usiyal
 Vicente Dupuy

References

External links 
 Provincial website

Departments of San Luis Province